Nikolai Aleksandrovich Dergachyov (born 24 May 1994) is an association football player from Russia.

Club career
He made his debut in the Russian Second Division for FC Saturn-2 Moscow Oblast on 24 May 2011 in a game against FC Istra.

He made his debut for the senior squad of PFC CSKA Moscow on 24 September 2014 in the Russian Cup game against FC Khimik Dzerzhinsk.

He made his Russian Football National League debut for FC Sokol Saratov on 11 July 2016 in a game against FC Zenit-2 Saint Petersburg.

References

External links

Player's profile at iDNES.cz (Czech)

1994 births
People from Serebryano-Prudsky District
Living people
Russian footballers
Association football midfielders
PFC CSKA Moscow players
Russian expatriate footballers
Expatriate footballers in the Czech Republic
Czech First League players
FK Dukla Prague players
FC Sokol Saratov players
FC Saturn Ramenskoye players
FC Irtysh Omsk players
FC Olimp-Dolgoprudny players
Sportspeople from Moscow Oblast